Calathus solieri is a species of ground beetle from the Platyninae subfamily that can be found on the islands such as Sardinia and Sicily.

References

solieri
Beetles described in 1834
Beetles of Europe